is a 2000 gangster film starring, written, directed, and edited by Takeshi Kitano. The film premiered on September 7, 2000 at the Venice Film Festival. The plot centers on a mature yakuza gangster who has to flee to Los Angeles, where he unites forces with his little brother and his brother’s gang.

It was the first American co-production directed by Kitano and the first American co-production in which he was an actor.

Plot
Yamamoto (Takeshi Kitano) is a brutal and experienced Yakuza enforcer whose boss was killed and whose clan was defeated in a criminal war with a rival family. Surviving clan members have few options: either to join the winners, reconciling with shame and distrust, or to die by committing seppuku. Yamamoto, however, decides to escape to Los Angeles along with his associate Kato (Susumu Terajima). There he finds his estranged half-brother Ken (Claude Maki), who runs a small-time drug business together with his local African-American friends. At the first meeting, Yamamoto badly hurts one of them, Denny (Omar Epps), for an attempt to scam him. Later, Denny becomes one of the Yamamoto's closest friends and associates.

Used to living in a clan and according to its laws, Yamamoto creates a hapless gang out of Ken's buddies. The new gang quickly and brutally attacks Mexican drug bosses and takes control of their territory in LA. They also form an alliance with Shirase (Masaya Kato), a criminal leader of Little Tokyo district, making their group even stronger. As time passes, Yamamoto and his new gang emerge as a formidable force, gradually expanding their turf to such an extent that they confront the powerful Italian Mafia. Now everybody respectfully addresses Yamamoto as Aniki (兄貴, elder brother). But soon Aniki suddenly loses any interest in their now successful but dangerous business, spending his time with a girlfriend or just sitting silently thinking about something. However, the Mafia ruthlessly strikes back, and soon Yamamoto and his gang are driven into a disastrous situation of no return as they are hunted down one by one.

Cast 
 Takeshi Kitano as Yamamoto, also referred to as Aniki (meaning elder brother)
 Omar Epps as Denny
 Tetsuya Watari as Jinseikai Boss
 Claude Maki as Ken
 Masaya Kato as Shirase, the "boss of Little Tokyo"
 Susumu Terajima as Kato, Yamamoto's lieutenant
 Royale Watkins as Jay
 Lombardo Boyar as Mo
 Ren Osugi as Harada
 Ryo Ishibashi as Ishihara
 James Shigeta as Sugimoto
 Tatyana Ali as Latifa
 Makoto Otake as Chief of Police
 Kouen Okumura as Hanaoka
 Naomasa Musaka as Hisamatsu
 Rino Katase as Night Club Madame
 Joy Nakagawa as Marina, Yamamoto's Girlfriend
 Amaury Nolasco as Victor
 Tuesday Knight as Prostitute
 Tony Colitti as Roberto
 Antwon Tanner as Colin

Soundtrack

Track listing

Production 
Impressed with Europeans' interest in yakuza, Kitano wrote what he described as an old-fashioned yakuza film.  To greater contrast the character against more familiar elements, he set it in a foreign country, choosing Los Angeles as a place-holder.  When producer Jeremy Thomas asked Kitano if he was interested in foreign productions, Kitano told him about the script.  Thomas promised him complete creative control, which Kitano said he got.  Commenting on the differing styles of filmmaking, Kitano said that American productions are more focused on the business side and are less sentimental.  Kitano cited their strong pride in their professionalism as positive aspect.

Release 
Several scenes were censored for the U.S. release.

Reception 
At the time of its release, Brother was hyped as Kitano's vehicle for breaking into the United States film market. The film has a 47% rating on Rotten Tomatoes based on 73 reviews. Roger Ebert, who has praised all of Kitano's films he has seen, complimented Kitano in his review but ultimately rated the film two out of four stars, writing that "Brother is a typical Kitano film in many ways, but not one of his best ones." In his review for Variety, David Rooney wrote, "Kitano frequently tips his hat to the American gangster movie in Coppola-styled scenes of confrontation and carnage. But while many of the action set pieces are enlivened by the director’s customary verve and humor, the plot advances clumsily with the narrative engine continually sputtering and stopping. Characters are so unsatisfyingly developed that the film delivers only on a basic level as a tale of gangster rivalry, greed, elimination and expansion, with its larger themes struggling to register... “Brother” is full of elegant compositions and poised, deliberate camera movement but rarely matches the visual impact of earlier Kitano features." Marc Savlov of the Austin Chronicle gave the film two and half stars out of five, stating, "Kitano's beat is an altogether grimmer affair, laden with dark irony and unexpurgated scenes of violence. It's rougher stuff than most would expect, though not unrewarding in its own horrific way." A reviewer of TimeOut commented, "A film of almost diagrammatic clarity, in which questions of loyalty, honour and, yes, brotherhood are mere pieces on the chessboard."

On his side, Kitano stated in an interview that he was not fully satisfied with the final result of Brother and that he regretted his "Hollywood" adventure which was supposed to bring him a broader audience with a higher exposure. Kitano said he had no intention of shooting outside Japan again.

References

External links

2000 crime thriller films
2000 films
American gangster films
British gangster films
English-language French films
French crime thriller films
Japanese crime thriller films
2000s English-language films
English-language Japanese films
2000s Japanese-language films
Films set in Los Angeles
Films produced by Jeremy Thomas
Shochiku films
Yakuza films
Films scored by Joe Hisaishi
Films directed by Takeshi Kitano
2000s American films
2000s British films
2000s Japanese films
2000s French films
Foreign films set in the United States